Nunnally may refer to a surname or a given name:

Surname
 James Nunnally (born 1990), American basketball for Maccabi Tel Aviv of the Israeli Basketball Premier League and the Euroleague
 Jon Nunnally, American professional baseball player
 Tiina Nunnally, American author and translator

Given name
 Nunnally Johnson, American filmmaker
 Nunnally Lamperouge, fictional character from the anime Code Geass

See also
 Jim Nunally, American bluegrass guitarist
 Nunneley
 Nunnely